Samuel Jacob Rubinstein was a 20th-century French orthodox Chief Rabbi independent from the Consistoire central. He was born in Poland.

Biography 
Samuel Jacob (Shmuel Yaakov) Rubinstein was the rabbi of the famous Agoudas Hakehilos Synagogue (Synagogue de la rue Pavée), at 10 Rue Pavée, in the Marais (known as the Pletzl), in the 4th arrondissement of Paris.

He succeeded Chief Rabbi Joël Leib HaLevi Herzog, father of Chief  Rabbi Yitzhak HaLevi Herzog, the future Chief Rabbi of Israel, as
rabbi of Agudas Hakehilos (אֲגֻדָּת־הַקְּהִלּוֹת, Union of Communities).

He contributed to the renewal of French Jewry after World War II and was active in the return of Jewish children entrusted to non-Jewish families during the war. He was in touch with humanitarian organizations such as the Vaad Hatzalah and other American organisations.

He was renowned as a great orator with an imposing  figure.

He published in 3 volumes in Hebrew, Sheerit Menahem (Paris, 1954) and Shemen LaNer in 2 volumes in Hebrew (Paris, 1959). The choice of the name of Sheerit Menahem for his major work is a reference to the name of his father, Rabbi Yirmeyahu Menachem Rubinstein.

Rabbi Rubinstein considered himself as a Kotzker Hassid, influenced by the Hassidic Master, Menachem Mendel of Kotzk (1787–1859), the founder of the Ger (Hasidic dynasty).

One finds the name of Rabbi Rubinstein in rabbinical publications, in his correspondence with other leading rabbis, such as Menashe Klein, the Ungvar Rebbe, of New York City, who lived in Paris after World War II.

In the world of Jewish orthodoxy, particularly Hasidic, Paris and France, before and after the war, were synonymous with him.

In his book, The Jews, Roger Peyrefitte describes him as follows: That night, he [Asher] had also dreamt of his master in Judaism, Chief Rabbi Rubinstein, whose white beard, wisdom and eloquence were the ornament of the synagogue on Rue Pavée.

He is mentioned by Ruth Blau the second wife of Amram Blau of Neturei Karta in her memoirs. It is he who presides over her orthodox conversion to Judaism:My son and myself were confirmed as proselytes by an orthodox rabbi, rabbi Rubinstein of the Synagogue de la rue Pavée. We received a certificate of conversion validating our admission to the Jewish Community in 1951.

If la Rue Pavée was the Synagogue where one would find him on a daily basis, in fact, he was also considered the rabbi of different  Shtiebles of the Pletzl.

The grandmother of Richard Prasquier, president of the Conseil Représentatif des Institutions juives de France (CRIF), since May 2007, had married Rabbi Rubinstein in 1958. Doctor Prasquier notes that his grandmother had married: the famous rabbi of la rue Pavée.

At his funeral, in the Synagogue de la rue Pavée, where the first row of benches had been removed for the occasion, the eulogies were given for Rabbi Rubinstein, in Yiddish, the language he preferred, and in French by Rabbi David Feuerwerker, in the presence of a huge crowd. Among the rabbis of the Consistoire present that day was the Chief Rabbi Ernest Gugenheim (1916–1977).

His  successor was Chief Rabbi Chaim Yaakov Rottenberg, from Antwerp, whose son, Rabbi Mordechai Rottenberg is the current rabbi of the Synagogue de la Rue Pavée.

The grandchildren of Chief Rabbi Rubinstein live in Israel: Rafi (Raphaël) Shimoni lives with his family in Tel-Aviv, where he is an engineer, head of department, in the Israeli aeronautics industry (IAI, Israel Aerospace Industries); Dr. Marc Klutstein is a cardiologist at the Shaare Zedek Medical Center in Jerusalem; and Evy Kuppershmidt heads a consulting firm.

Rabbi Rubinstein and the Rebbe of Lubavitch, Menachem Mendel Schneerson 
The Rebbe of Lubavitch, Menachem Mendel Schneerson, in a letter dated from Brooklyn, New York, Elul 1, 5711 [1950] writes about him: "A little while ago, I wrote to the great Rav [Rabbi], distinguished Hassid who fears God, Rav Shmuel Yaakov Rubinstein."

They knew each other from before the war. Rabbi Rubinstein recounted with emotion that during the census of the Parisians, when the Nazis entered Paris, Rabbi Schneerson was absent from home. When he learned that next to his name was written, religion orthodox, he went to the census bureau to have it replaced by Jewish.

From Nice, in Tishri 5702, (1941) Rabbi Schneerson went to the Italian border to get an Etrog, for the Jewish Festival of Sukkot. He came back with two Etrogim, one for himself, the other he offered to Rabbi Rubinstein, who found himself also in Nice.

Testimony 
A description of Rabbi Rubinstein is given by Gutta Sternbuch in 2005:

In the meantime, we felt the lack of a rabbinical leader in Aix-les-Bains. And so when we heard of a Rabbi Rubinstein in nearby Lyon, I went with Dr. [Hillel] Seidman to visit him. When we entered Rabbi Rubinstein's home, his wife greeted us. When I told her my name and that I came from Warsaw, she said to me, "Wait a moment, please", and stepped out. A minute later, she returned and showed me to Rabbi Rubinstein's room.

Rabbi Rubinstein was sitting behind a table covered with volumes of Gemara. He was very handsome, with a long, straight beard but what one noticed first about him were his eyes, which seemed to dance with laughter and love. They were so deep that when I looked into them I was incredibly moved and almost began to tremble. I felt like I was looking at someone from Gan Eden.

I told Rabbi Rubinstein, "I am Gutta Eisenzweig from Warsaw."  He asked me, "Are you the granddaughter of Berel Gefen?"

I answered that yes, I was. With that, he stood up and came around the desk, looked straight into my eyes and exclaimed, "Du bist an einikel fun Reb Berel. Du bist an einikel! You are a grandchild of R. Berel!" He couldn't believe that I was alive. He and my grandfather had grown up together in Białystok and had learned together in cheder. He was choked with emotion and could say no more, and tears streamed from his eyes.

This was one of the most powerful experiences I had after the war. After this, I went to Rabbi Rubinstein many times. He was a loving man, and he always had a kind word for everyone. In a sense, he brought my grandfather back to me and re-awoke my love for him.

Gutta Sternbuch notes that her wedding was special since it was Rabbi Rubinstein who officiated.

Customs 

 On Saturday afternoon, following Minha, the congregation took the communal meal of Seudah Shlishit together, in the room on the right when entering the building from outside. This third meal of the Shabbat took place in total darkness, which gave it a particular cachet. No one wanted to see the Shabbat depart. Rabbi Rubinstein commented in Yiddish on the weekly portion of the Torah. Zemiros (songs) accompanied the meal which consisted of Matzos with oily sardines on top.
 Rabbi Rubinstein did not wear in Paris a Shtreimel. His successor, Rabbi Chaim Yaakov Rottenberg, will wear one, but only during the communal meal of the Shabbat afternoon, and not outside of the room, where it took place.
 It was a privilege to be invited by Rabbi Rubinstein, on Saturday morning, after the prayers, to taste the Cholent (there exist different kinds of Cholent, his was made with potatoes) prepared by the Rebbitzin. He indicated to the privileged to stay behind in the synagogue, to go up afterwards to his home, in the building next door. Likewise, he invited individuals to his Sukkah built in the courtyard adjoining the synagogue.
 For the recitation of the Shema, during the morning prayer, the Vilna Gaon notes that the Mitzvah to see the Tzitzit should not be annulled by kissing them. The custom of Rabbi Rubinstein was to make a circular movement with the tzitzit; he lifted the tzitzit in front of his eyes (to look at them), then kissed them.
 A renowned orator, Rabbi Rubinstein paused during his discourses. He was not reading a prepared text. He moved his hand holding his long beard, from top to bottom, then continued his presentation. This short waiting was done in a total and respectful silence.

References

Bibliography 
 Roger Peyrefitte, The Jews. A Fictional Venture Into The Follies Of Antisemitism. Bobbs-Merrill: New York City, 1965.
 Ruth Blau. Les Gardiens De La Cité. Histoire D'Une Guerre Sainte. Flammarion: Paris, 1978. 
 Nancy L. Green. The Pletzl of Paris. Jewish Immigrant Workers in the Belle Epoque. Holmes & Meier: New York & London, 1986 
 Joseph Friedenson & David Kranzler. Heroine Of Rescue. The incredible story of Recha Sternbuch who saved thousands from the Holocaust. Mesorah Publications: Brooklyn, N.Y., 1984, 1999 
 Elie Feuerwerker. Viewing And Kissing Tzitzit. Letter to the Editor. The Jewish Press, New York, Friday, January 24, 2003, p. 76
 Gutta Sternbuch & David Kranzler. Gutta: Memories of a Vanished World. A Bais Yaakov Teacher's Poignant Account of the War Years With a Historical Overview. Feldheim: Jerusalem, New York, 2005. 
 Marc B. Shapiro. Between The Yeshiva World And Modern Orthodoxy. The Life and Works of Rabbi Jehiel Jacob Weinberg 1884-1996. The Littman Library of Jewish Civilization: Oxford, Portland, Oregon, 2007. 
Esther Farbstein. The Forgotten Memoirs. Moving Personal Accounts from Rabbis who Survived the Holocaust. Shaar Press: New York, 2011. ,

French Orthodox rabbis
Polish Orthodox rabbis
20th-century French rabbis
Hasidic Judaism
Year of birth missing
Year of death missing